John M. Boag (6 April 1874 – 7 February 1954) was a Scottish professional footballer, best remembered for his seven years as a centre forward in the Football League with Derby County. He also played for Cowlairs, Ashfield, East Stirlingshire and finished his career with Brentford. While with Derby County, Boag was a part of the Rams' 1898, 1899 and 1903 losing FA Cup Final sides.

Personal life 
After his retirement from football, Boag invested in a fishmongers, a laundrette and a snooker hall.

Career statistics

References 

1874 births
1954 deaths
Footballers from Glasgow
Scottish footballers
English Football League players
Scottish Football League players
Cowlairs F.C. players
Brentford F.C. players
Ashfield F.C. players
East Stirlingshire F.C. players
Derby County F.C. players
Southern Football League players
Association football forwards
Alloa Athletic F.C. players
FA Cup Final players